Robert Fiske may refer to:

 Robert Fiske (actor) (1889–1944), American film actor
 Robert B. Fiske (born 1930), American lawyer and Whitewater special prosecutor
 Robert Hartwell Fiske (1948–2016), writer, editor, and publisher of The Vocabula Review

See also
 Robert Fiske Bradford (1902–1983), American politician
 Robert Fiske Griggs (1881–1962), American botanist and ecologist
 Robert Fisk (1946–2020), British journalist
 Robert Farris Fisk (1819–1863), American lawyer and librarian